Fredrick Brathwaite (born November 24, 1972) is a Canadian ice hockey coach and former player.

Brathwaite played as a goaltender, and spent his career with the Edmonton Oilers, Calgary Flames, St. Louis Blues and Columbus Blue Jackets in the NHL before finishing his career overseas with Ak Bars Kazan, Avangard Omsk and Adler Mannheim. Brathwaite was named Deutsche Eishockey Liga MVP in 2009.

Playing career
Following junior hockey with the Orillia Travelways/Orillia Laidlaw, Brathwaite played major junior for the Oshawa Generals, London Knights and Detroit Jr. Red Wings in the Ontario Hockey League (OHL).  Undrafted, he was signed by the Edmonton Oilers in 1993.  He played in the Oilers' system for three seasons between the NHL and Edmonton's American Hockey League (AHL) affiliate, the Cape Breton Oilers.

In 1996–97, Brathwaite began a two-season stint with the Manitoba Moose of the International Hockey League (IHL).  In his first season with the Moose, he scored a rare goal as a goaltender November 9, 1996.

Brathwaite began the 1998–99 season on the Canadian National Team before being signed by the Calgary Flames.  He appeared in 28 games, recording a 2.45 goals against average and .915 save percentage in what qualified as his NHL rookie season.  He remained with the Flames for two more seasons until he was traded to the St. Louis Blues by general manager Craig Button as part of a deal for goaltender Roman Turek in the 2001 off-season. He played with the Blues for two seasons as a backup before being signed by the Columbus Blue Jackets for the 2003–04.  In his sole season with the Blue Jackets, he backed up Marc Denis while also spending time in the AHL with the Syracuse Crunch.

Due to the 2004–05 NHL lockout, Brathwaite played overseas in the Russian Superleague for Ak-Bars Kazan.  He remained there for two seasons until returning to North America to play in the AHL for the Chicago Wolves.  After two seasons in Chicago, Brathwaite went back to Europe to join Adler Mannheim of the German Deutsche Eishockey Liga. In his first season in Germany, Brathwaite reeled off a 2.37 GAA, .925 save percentage performance to be named the German league's 2009 MVP.

Coaching career
After his playing career, he worked as goaltending coach of German team Adler Mannheim and served as Hockey Canada's goaltending consultant.

On July 10, 2017, the New York Islanders announced that Brathwaite was hired as goaltending coach. He was replaced on July 25, 2018, by Piero Greco.

On January 17, 2021, Brathwaite was hired as goaltending coach for the Henderson Silver Knights prior to their inaugural season. On April 24, 2021, with starting goaltender Logan Thompson unavailable, Brathwaite dressed as backup goaltender for the Silver Knights at 48 years of age.

Personal life
Brathwaite was born in Ottawa, Ontario to parents who had emigrated to Canada from Barbados in 1964. He appeared in the Jermaine Dupri rap video "Welcome to Atlanta" with the rappers the St. Lunatics. The scene was shot at Busch Stadium in St. Louis.

Career statistics

Regular season and playoffs

International

See also
List of black NHL players

References

External links

 Fred Brathwaite on Elite Prospects

1972 births
Living people
Adler Mannheim players
Ak Bars Kazan players
Black Canadian ice hockey players
Calgary Flames players
Canadian ice hockey goaltenders
Canadian people of Barbadian descent
Cape Breton Oilers players
Columbus Blue Jackets players
Detroit Junior Red Wings players
Edmonton Oilers players
Ice hockey coaches
Ice hockey people from Ottawa
London Knights players
Manitoba Moose (IHL) players
Oshawa Generals players
Saint John Flames players
St. Louis Blues players
Syracuse Crunch players
Undrafted National Hockey League players
New York Islanders coaches
Canadian expatriate ice hockey players in Germany
Canadian expatriate ice hockey players in Russia
Canadian ice hockey coaches